Macedonia competed at the 2012 Summer Paralympics in London, United Kingdom from August 29 to September 9, 2012.

Medallists

Shooting

See also

 Macedonia at the 2012 Summer Olympics

References

Nations at the 2012 Summer Paralympics
2012
2012 in Republic of Macedonia sport